Dolichopoda lycia is a species of cave cricket within the family Rhaphidophoridae. The species is found around caves around Antalya, Turkey.

References 

Insects described in 2006
Insects of Turkey
Rhaphidophoridae